Habroxenus is a genus of fungus weevils in the beetle family Anthribidae. There is one described species in Habroxenus, H. politus.

References

Further reading

 
 

Anthribidae
Articles created by Qbugbot